Rapid Fire may refer to:

Fictional character
Rapid Fire (G.I. Joe), a fictional character in the G.I. Joe universe

Film
Rapid Fire (1989 film), a 1989 American action film by David A. Prior
Rapid Fire (1992 film), a 1992 American action film starring Brandon Lee
Rapid Fire (2006 film), a 2006 action television film

Music
Rapidfire, a pre-Guns N' Roses band featuring Axl Rose
Rapid Fire (mixtape), a mixtape by Young Gunz
"Rapid Fire", a song by Judas Priest from the album British Steel